Robert E. Gribbin III (born February 5, 1946 Durham, North Carolina) is a retired American ambassador to Rwanda (19961999) and the Central African Republic (19931995) and author of In the Aftermath of Genocide: The U.S. role in Rwanda.

Biography

Gribbin's father is an Episcopal clergyman who worked with many campus ministries.  He spent much of his childhood in Tuscaloosa, Alabama at the University of Alabama. He graduated from the University of the South in Sewanee, Tennessee in 1968.  After college, he served as a Peace Corps volunteer working with a team of civil engineers on implementing a water distribution system.  When he returned to the United States, he became a project manager with Head Start (program) in Atlanta.  He left after nine months to attend graduate school at the SAIS.

Career

His first posting in the Foreign Service was in the Central African Republic "notorious at the time [for its] its rather despotic ruler, Jean-Bédel Bokassa, who later became emperor. But he was not the emperor in 1974; he was cher Papa, maréchal and président à vie. In any case, he ran the country as his own personal fiefdom."

References

People from Durham, North Carolina
1946 births
Living people
Ambassadors of the United States to the Central African Republic
Ambassadors of the United States to Rwanda
People from Tuscaloosa, Alabama
Sewanee: The University of the South alumni
Peace Corps volunteers
Paul H. Nitze School of Advanced International Studies alumni
American non-fiction writers
20th-century American diplomats